The 2013 Uzbekistan Cup was the 21st season of the annual Uzbek football Cup competition. The Cup draw was held on February 25, 2013 in Tashkent.

The competition to start on March 24, 2013, and ends in September 25, 2013 with the final to be held at the Pakhtakor Markaziy Stadium in Tashkent. Bunyodkor are the defending champions.

The cup winner is guaranteed a place in the 2014 AFC Champions League.

Calendar

First round

On March 22, 2013, Uzbek PFL authority announced changes of participants of 2013 Uzbek Cup. FK Khiva and Neftchi Tinchlik are replaced by Bunyodkor-2 and Bukhoro-2 because of lack of the financial support.

FK Khiva - Bukhoro-2, Kokand 1912 - Neftchi Tinchlik, FK Orol Nukus - Xorazm FK Urganch matches have been canceled. Bukhoro-2', Kokand 1912 and FK Orol Nukus qualified to the next round.

 Note: Bukhoro-2, Kokand 1912, FK Orol Nukus qualified to the next round.

Bracket

Round of 32

The one leg matches will be played on April 6–7.

|}

Round of 16
The sixteen winners from the Round of 32 were drawn into eight two-legged ties. 

|}

Quarterfinals

|}

Semifinals

|}

Final

|}

References

Cup
Uzbekistan Cup
2013